Amos Watson (February 26, 1926 – September 18, 1997) was an American Negro league pitcher for the Indianapolis Clowns and Baltimore Elite Giants in the 1940s.

A native of Lake Alfred, Florida, Watson posted a 27–3 record on the mound as an eighteen-year-old for the barnstorming Jimmy Hill’s All-Stars in 1944. He died in Winter Haven, Florida in 1997 at age 71.

References

External links
 and Seamheads

1926 births
1997 deaths
Baltimore Elite Giants players
Indianapolis Clowns players
Baseball pitchers
Baseball players from Florida
People from Polk County, Florida
20th-century African-American sportspeople